The Chuklya is a river in Perm Krai, Russia, a left tributary of the Ruch, which in turn is a tributary of the Veslyana. The main tributary is the Ydzhydvozh, which enters from the right.

References 

Rivers of Perm Krai